Kilmoyley, officially Kilmoyly, is a village in County Kerry, Ireland. It is 6 km southeast of Ballyheigue, and 10 km north of Tralee.

Amenities
Prior to more recent development, the original settlement in the area comprised two or three dwellings and the local Roman Catholic church. This church, the Church of the Sacred Heart, was built in 1873.

There is a national school in Kilmoyley called Scoil Naomh Eirc. In Kilmoyley there is also a lough known as Lerrig Lough.

See also
 List of towns and villages in the Republic of Ireland

References

External links
kilmoyleygaa.com (archived)

Towns and villages in County Kerry
Articles on towns and villages in Ireland possibly missing Irish place names